The Japan Junior Figure Skating Championships is a figure skating competition held annually to crown the national champions on the Junior level for Japan. The first Japan Junior Figure Skating Championships was held in 1931. It is the junior level equivalent of the Japan Figure Skating Championships. Skaters who place high enough at this competition can earn invitations to compete at the senior championships.

Junior medalists

Men

Ladies

Pairs

Ice dancing

Novice medalists

Men

Novice A

Novice B

Ladies

Novice A

Novice B

Ice dancing

See also
 Japan Figure Skating Championships

References

External links
 Japan Skating Federation official results & data

Figure skating national championships
Figure skating in Japan
National championships in Japan